The  or  is a Spanish breed of dog of ratter type, found on the island of Mallorca in the Balearic Islands.

History 

The origins of the breed are unclear, with no documentary evidence before the late nineteenth century. In the early twentieth century, Valencians migrated to Mallorca; they may have brought some ratters with them. It is widely believed that the Ca Rater Mallorquí is related to the Gos Rater Valencià; it is also possible that there was some infusion of English terrier blood in the history of the breed.

The breed was recognised by the autonomous community of the Balearic Islands with the publication of the breed standard in the Butlletí Oficial de les Illes Balears in 2002, and in 2004 it received national recognition when the standard was published in the Boletín Oficial del Estado, the official journal of the government of Spain.

Use 

The Ca Rater Mallorquí is used on the island of Mallorca to hunt rats and rabbits. It is a good watchdog, and a good companion animal.

See also
 Dogs portal
 List of dog breeds

References 

Dog breeds originating in the Balearic Islands
Terriers